National Route 198 is a short national highway of Japan connecting Moji-ku, Kitakyūshū and Moji-ku, Kitakyūshū in Japan, with a total length of 0.6 km (0.37 mi).

References

National highways in Japan
Roads in Fukuoka Prefecture